Ole-Anton Teigen (born 15 July 1954) is a Norwegian politician for the Socialist Left Party.

Born in Lyngen, took his higher education in 1979. He was a member of Lyngen municipal council from 1991 to 2007, and of Troms county council from 2003 to 2007. He served as a deputy representative to the Norwegian Parliament from Troms during the terms 2001–2005 and 2005–2009.

From 2001 he is also a member of Nord-Hålogaland assize court. From 2007 to 2010 he is the chair of the Norwegian Farmers and Smallholders Union.

References

1954 births
Living people
People from Lyngen
Deputy members of the Storting
Socialist Left Party (Norway) politicians
Troms politicians
University of Tromsø alumni
Norwegian farmers